Qabdesh Zhumadilov (25 April 1936 – 5 April 2021) was a Kazakh author and national writer of Kazakhstan. He was born in Xinjiang.

Zhumadilov died on 5 April 2021 at the age of 84.

Works
Соңғы көш, Almaty: "Jazushy", 1998.
Ata Meken, Almaty : Zhalyn, 1985.
Taghdar, Almaty: "Jazushy", 1988.

References

1936 births
2021 deaths
Kazakh-language writers
Writers from Xinjiang
20th-century Kazakhstani writers
20th-century male writers
Kazakhstani male writers